The SS Poseidon (formerly the RMS Atlantis) is a fictional transatlantic ocean liner that first appeared in the 1969 novel The Poseidon Adventure by Paul Gallico and later in four films based on the novel. The ship is named after the god of the seas in Greek mythology.

Descriptions

The novel
In the 1969 novel, the ship is traveling across the Atlantic on her first month-long cruise with African and South American ports of call, after her recent sale and conversion from the 35-year old British ocean liner RMS Atlantis, into the Greek cruise ship SS Poseidon. On December 26, the Poseidon capsizes when a landslide in the Mid-Atlantic Ridge produces a massive 99-foot tsunami. The description of the ship is slim; Gallico described her as a "quadruple-screw ocean liner of 81,000 tons, as long as four city blocks, and as high as an apartment building with three massive funnels", which would make her very similar to the RMS Queen Mary. Gallico was inspired to write the novel after his experience as a passenger on the Queen Mary after the liner tilted alarmingly after being hit by a large wave. He also describes the Poseidon'''s fatal flaw as "riding high in the water, improperly ballasted and technically unseaworthy", this, he wrote, made the Poseidon vulnerable to capsizing.

The 1972 film version
In the 1972 film The Poseidon Adventure, the ship is in the Mediterranean on her final voyage, which will take her to the breaker's yards in Greece, when an undersea earthquake produces a tsunami that capsizes the ship just after midnight on New Year's Eve. The film uses the RMS Queen Mary as a stand-in for Poseidon, using actual onboard locations as well as a 25-foot long miniature model. The captain (Leslie Nielsen) complains about Poseidon being top-heavy and hence vulnerable to capsizing by large waves, and he makes clear his intent to take on ballast, but the representative of the owners refuses to allow this and indeed, orders him to proceed at full speed, threatening to fire him and replace him with another officer. Of the hundreds aboard, no more than six survive.

Beyond the Poseidon Adventure
In the 1979 film Beyond the Poseidon Adventure, which is a direct continuation of the story from the first film, the Poseidon is an abandoned overturned wreck that has not yet sunk. It is boarded by a small group of salvagers and a group of thieves in disguise (who are looking for gold and a lost plutonium shipment). Eventually trapped in the ship, they encounter a group of passengers and crew who are still aboard. In the end, the Poseidon's boilers and plutonium cargo explode, destroying most of the hull and sinking the ship permanently and, worse, irradiating her wreckage to unsafe  
levels.

The 2005 TV film
In the 2005 TV film The Poseidon Adventure, Poseidon is a modern motor driven cruise ship using propeller pods, which is sailing from Cape Town, South Africa on a cruise through the Indian Ocean to Sydney, Australia. The events that lead to the capsize of the ship vary greatly from the original book, as it is a partly foiled terrorist plot to sink the ship using explosives below the waterline which leads to Poseidon capsizing due to its center of gravity. As the survivors reached the hole that caused the ship to capsize they successfully escaped and were rescued. They then watched as the ship sank bow first into the Indian Ocean.

Poseidon
In the 2006 film Poseidon, the ship is a British ocean liner registered in Southampton, which is sailing from an unnamed port in the United Kingdom (presumably London as one of the characters mentions it briefly) to New York City. While the first film used Queen Mary as a stand-in for Poseidon, the ship in the 2006 film has an original exterior design and superstructure not based on any real-life vessel, although the lower hull and interior was partly inspired by the modern ocean liner RMS Queen Mary 2. The ship is of a modern design without any flaws, but it is struck by a huge wave just after midnight on New Year's Eve and capsizes. Unlike the original, the wave is not a tsunami caused by an undersea earthquake or landslide but a rogue wave, possibly caused by the shifting of currents shown in a deleted scene. After only six survivors escape, the ship turns over again before sinking stern first in the Atlantic.

Commonality
In the bulk of each story, a group of survivors try to make their way to the overturned top of the capsized vessel, hoping to get to safety.

See also
 SOS (1993 video game)
 Titanic'', an ocean liner which struck an iceberg.

References

Fictional ships